Associazione Calcio Dilettantistica Guidonia Montecelio is an Italian association football club located in Guidonia Montecelio, Lazio.

It in the season 2010–11, from Serie D group G relegated, in the play-out, to Eccellenza Lazio, where it plays in the current season.

Its colors are yellow and red.

External links
Official homepage

Football clubs in Italy
Association football clubs established in 1954
Football clubs in Lazio
1954 establishments in Italy
Sport in the Metropolitan City of Rome Capital